Lake Biograd is a lake in Kolašin municipality, in northern Montenegro. It is a glacial lake, located on the Bjelasica Mountain, within Biogradska Gora national park.

Geography
Lake Biograd is located in the heart of Biogradska Gora national park, on an altitude of 1,094 m. It is the biggest and most attractive lake of 7 glacial lakes scattered across the national park. It has an area of 228,500 m2, and average depth of 4.5 m.

The maximum depth is 12.1 m. The lake is 870 m long and 261 m wide. It is filled by Biograd river, a permanent tributary, and few periodical streams. Its outflow is Jezerstica.

Biograd
Biograd
Kolašin